Galenia is a synonym of Aizoon

Selected species
Species include:
Galenia acutifolia Adamson 
Galenia affinis Sond.     
Galenia africana L. 
Galenia collina (Eckl. & Zeyh.) Walp.
Galenia crystallina (Eckl. & Zeyh.) Fenzl
Galenia cymosa Adamson
Galenia dregeana Fenzl ex Sond.
Galenia ecklonis Walp.
Galenia exigua Adamson
Galenia filiformis (Thunb.) N.E.Br.
Galenia fruticosa (L.f.) Sond.
Galenia glandulifera Bittrich
Galenia hemisphaerica Adamson
Galenia herniariifolia (C.Presl) Fenzl
Galenia hispidissima Fenzl
Galenia meziana K.Müll.
Galenia namaensis Schinz
Galenia portulacacea Fenzl
Galenia procumbens L.f.
Galenia prostrata G.Schellenb.
Galenia pruinosa Sond.
Galenia pubescens (Eckl. & Zeyh.) Druce 
Galenia rigida Adamson
Galenia sarcophylla Fenzl
Galenia secunda (L.f.) Sond.
Galenia squamulosa (Eckl. & Zeyh.) Fenzl
Galenia subcarnosa Adamson

References

Aizoaceae
Flora of Southern Africa
Aizoaceae genera